Barleria lupulina, the hop-headed barleria, is a plant in the family Acanthaceae. It occurs in Southeast Asia.

References

lupulina